The Second Ohio General Assembly was the second meeting of the Ohio state legislature, composed of the Ohio State Senate and the Ohio House of Representatives.  It convened in Chillicothe, Ohio, on December 5, 1803, and adjourned February 17, 1804. This General Assembly coincided with the second year of Edward Tiffin's first term as Ohio Governor.

Background
Under Ohio's first constitution, State Senators were elected to two year terms. For this class, half were elected for one year and half for two years. Members of the House were elected for each term. Article I, section 2 and 6 of Ohio's first constitution called for an enumeration of white male inhabitants of 21 years age every four years, with the number of representatives and senators for each county apportioned by the legislature based on this census. Article I, section 3 called for elections the second Tuesday in October.

State Senate

Districts
For this session, the legislature apportioned four senators for Hamilton, Warren, Montgomery, Butler and Greene Counties, two senators for Washington and Gallia Counties, two senators for Ross and Franklin Counties, one senator for Adams and Scioto Counties, two senators for Jefferson and Columbiana Counties, one senator for Clermont County, one senator for Fairfield County, one senator for Trumbull County and one senator for Belmont County.

Members

Ohio House of Representatives

Districts
For this session, the legislature apportioned eight representatives for Hamilton, Warren, Montgomery, Butler and Greene Counties, three representatives for Washington and Gallia Counties, four representatives for Ross and Franklin Counties, three representatives for Adams and Scioto Counties, four representatives for Jefferson and Columbiana Counties, two representatives for Clermont County, two representatives for Fairfield County, two representatives for Trumbull County and two representatives for Belmont County.

Members

Major events
The Twelfth Amendment to the United States Constitution was ratified on December 28 and signed on December 30.

On January 7, the State Militia was organized in four divisions, and Major Generals and Quartermaster Generals were named for each division by a joint session.

On February 16, judges were elected for a new county, and to fill vacancies in other counties.

An enumeration in each county of “free white male citizens of the age of 21 years” was made as follows:

Major legislation

On January 7, a new county was formed from portions of Washington and Fairfield counties. It was originally to be called Livingston, but was amended to be Muskingum before final passage, with county seat of Zanesville.

Acts were passed to allow alien ownership of land, regulating admission of attorneys to practice, and for opening and improving roads.

A crime and punishment act was passed. Treason, rape, murder, malicious maiming and 1st degree arson were punishable by death. Manslaughter, 2nd degree arson, maiming without malice, by a fine of not more than $1000 and two years in prison. Perjury and subornation of perjury, the same punishment with disenfranchisement; forgery, 30 lashes and fine equal to sum fraudulently obtained and disenfranchisement; counterfeiting, 39 lashes, fine not exceeding $1000 and disenfranchisement; burglary not more than $500 fine and imprisonment of not more than one year; robbery, 59 lashes for 1st offence and 100 lashes for 2nd offence; larceny, 15 lashes for 1st offence and 30 lashes for 2nd.

See also
 List of Ohio state legislatures

Notes

References

External links

Ohio legislative sessions
Ohio
Ohio